The 1996 PPG Indy Car World Series season, the eighteenth in the CART era of U.S. open-wheel racing, consisted of 16 races,  beginning in Homestead, Florida on March 3 and concluding in Monterey, California on September 8.   Rookie of the Year was Alex Zanardi.  This was the first season after the split with the Indy Racing League and the last year that CART operated as "IndyCar," with the trademark reverting to Indianapolis Motor Speedway.  The Indianapolis 500 was replaced by the U.S. 500, held in Brooklyn, Michigan.

The PPG Indy Car World Series Drivers' Champion was Jimmy Vasser, whose Honda/Reynard won four of the first six races, including the inaugural US 500.  The competition soon starting catching up to Vasser, who had to fend off two late challenges from veterans: Al Unser Jr.'s consistent performance saw him come close to tying Vasser late in the season, but his hopes evaporated after a last-lap crash at Mid-Ohio Sports Car Course and an engine failure while leading on the final turn at Road America. Michael Andretti's resulting victory there and in Vancouver put him in contention at the final race, but a disappointing result at Laguna Seca gave Vasser the championship.  

Rookie driver Jeff Krosnoff and a course worker died in an accident at the Toronto round, and one week later, Emerson Fittipaldi was in a serious accident at the start of the Marlboro 500 and had to retire.

Teams and drivers
The following teams and drivers competed in the 1996 Indy Car World Series season.

Season Summary

Schedule

– Toronto was scheduled to run 170 miles, but was shortened due to the fatal accident of Jeff Krosnoff.
 Oval/Speedway
 Dedicated road course
 Temporary street circuit

Race results

Final driver standings

Note:  Jeff Krosnoff died in an accident at the Molson Indy Toronto.

Nation's Cup 

 Top result per race counts towards Nation's Cup.

Chassis Constructor's Cup

Engine Manufacturer's Cup

Drivers breakdown

References

See also
 1996 Toyota Atlantic Championship season
 1996 Indianapolis 500
 1996 Indy Racing League
 1996–97 Indy Racing League
 1996 Indy Lights season

Champ Car seasons
IndyCar
IndyCar
 
IndyCar